Cho La is a summit pass located  above sea level in the Solukhumbu District in northeastern Nepal. It connects the village of Dzongla to the east and the village of Thagnak to the west.

Tourism 
The pass is on the Gokyo trail in the Khumbu Everest region. To the west the trail continues to the Gokyo Lakes, crossing the Ngozumpa glacier on the way. To the east the trail joins the Everest Base Camp trek.

The pass can be physically demanding and may require crampons on top of the slippery glacier. The edge of the glacier is unstable.

References 

Mountain passes of Nepal
Mountain passes of the Himalayas
Hiking trails in Nepal